The Grotesque (also known as Grave Indiscretion and Gentlemen Don't Eat Poets) is a 1995 British film by John-Paul Davidson, adapted from the 1989 novel of the same name by Patrick McGrath. It stars Alan Bates, Lena Headey, Theresa Russell and Sting.

Costume Designer Colleen Atwood worked on the film, and McGrath's wife, actress Maria Aitken, performed in a supporting role.

Plot
Eccentric paleontologist Sir Hugo has little interest in his wife, Lady Harriet, but the new butler, Fledge, gives her the attention she needs. Hugo dislikes his daughter Cleo's fiancé, aspiring poet Sidney, and Sidney's subsequent disappearance places the household in further turmoil.

Cast
Alan Bates as Sir Hugo Coal
Theresa Russell as Lady Harriet Coal
Sting as Fledge
Lena Headey as Cleo Coal
Jim Carter as George Lecky
Anna Massey as Mrs. Giblet
Trudie Styler as Doris
Maria Aitken as Lavinia Freebody
James Fleet as Inspector Limp
Steven Mackintosh as Sidney Giblet
John Mills as Sir Edward Cleghorn
Annette Badland as Connie Babblehump
Bob Goody as Father Pim

Release
The film was released under the title Gentlemen Don't Eat Poets in the United States, and later its US video title was Grave Indiscretion. It is also known as Butler morden leiser in Germany, Grotesco in Portugal, and Perverso in Spain.

The film is available on Region 2 DVD (as The Grotesque) and VHS (Grave Indiscretion) only, though both versions are out of print.

Reception
Nathan Rabin of The A.V. Club called the film "predictable", noting its "lack of substance" and that "Bates and Russell deliver amusingly over-the-top performances...but Sting and Styler give wooden performances that make their characters seem not so much eerie and mysterious as heavily sedated."

References

External links
 

1995 films
British LGBT-related films
Male bisexuality in film
Artisan Entertainment films
Films scored by Anne Dudley
Films produced by Trudie Styler
1990s English-language films
1990s British films